The Vancouver Film Critics Circle Award for Best Screenplay for a Canadian Film is an annual award given by the Vancouver Film Critics Circle. The Best Screenplay for a Canadian Film Award was first awarded in 2015 for films released in 2014.

Winners

2010s

2020s

References

Best Screenplay for a Canadian Film
Awards established in 2015
Screenwriting awards for film